Der Neue Schreibtisch is a short German comedy film made in 1913. In the plot a busy businessman tries to get comfortable at his new desk, so he starts cutting off parts of the legs, but eventually shortens the legs off entirely.

External links 
Complete film at Google
 

1913 comedy films
1913 films
Films of the German Empire
German silent short films
German black-and-white films
1913 short films
German comedy short films
Silent comedy films
1910s German films
1910s German-language films